Anna Kirstine Bloch (née Lindemann; 2 February 1868, in Horsens – 25 November 1953, in Copenhagen) was a Danish actress.

Early life
Anna Lindemann's mother Bodil Margrethe Gylding (1838–1875) died when she was seven years old. Her father Johan Sørensen Lindemann (1825–1909) was a doctor in Horsens. She was taught privately, and consistently showed an enthusiasm for the theatre. Her father regarded acting as an unsuitable profession but eventually allowed her to join the Royal Danish Theatre after talking to its general director Edvard Fallesen.

Career

Between her first two roles she was taught by her husband to be, . Together they wrote Miss Nelly in 1886, in which she later played the main role. After their marriage in Summer 1887, she took her husband's surname.

Anna Bloch's breakthrough came in 1888 as Trine in April Fools by Johan Ludvig Heiberg. Literary historian  credits her with the "phenomenal run of 31 performances" of this modernised revival of the 1826 original. Another early role was that of Hilde in Ibsen's The Lady from the Sea in 1889.

Bloch was awarded the Ingenio et arti gold medal in 1910. This was the 25th anniversary of her first role, and in a commentary for Politiken, Danish writer Emma Gad says that Bloch could make a normally insignificant role seem important to a play, as with the "brilliant and peculiar humour" of her portrayal of the "noble slut" Eugenia in Ludvig Holberg's Don Ranudo de Colibrados. For Gad, her most memorable performance was as the peasant girl Anjutha in Tolstoy's The Power of Darkness, where she was "gripped by a fear so wild" that "her mysterious horror ... rippled down to the auditorium and ran like a shudder from row to row."

Bloch left the Royal Theatre in 1918, although she returned for a season as guest actress and rejoined from 1922 to 1925. She found herself typecast as the young girl or woman, even playing the fourteen-year-old Hedevig in Ibsen's The Wild Duck in 1921 at the age of 53. Only really at home in 19th century theatre and unable to find suitable roles in the new era which began after the First World War, she was overtaken by the naturalism in theatre arts which she had helped pioneer. She did however tour the provinces, and appeared at the Betty Nansen Teatret. She can be heard in a scene from Jens Christian Hostrup's  (The neighbours across the road) recorded in 1938.

Danish literary critic  refers to Bloch as the Royal Theatre's "foremost naturalist actor" of the time. Although she never acted in films, she was, according to Riis, a role model for Danish actress Clara Pontoppidan.

She wrote a one-act comedy  (Such bills). The Royal Theatre presented this in 1923 with Bloch in the leading role and it was published in 1924. She also wrote two radio dramas, Epilog in 1934 and Veni, vidi, vici in 1935.

Anna Bloch is buried in Vestre Cemetery, Copenhagen.

Roles
Anna Bloch's roles included:

Royal Danish Theatre
 1885	En skærsommernatsdrøm as Titania
 1885	Den bogstavelige udtydning as Jenny
 1888	Barselstuen as Dorte Knapmagers
 1888	Det lykkelige skibbrud as Young Girl
 1891	Hedda Gabler as Thea Elvsted
 1900	Recensenten og dyret as Rose, opvartningspige (waiting girl)
 1901	Skærmydsler as Ellen
 1904	Opstandelse as Fedosia
 1905	Ole Lukøje as Poor Relative
 1906	Helte as Raina, Petkoff's daughter
 1909	Naar den ny vin blomstrer as Albert
 1912	En søndag paa Amager as Lisbeth
 1912	Indenfor murene as Esther
 1913	Affæren as Amalie Busk
 1914	Kærlighed og lykketræf as Silvia, Orgon's daughter
 1915	Lottens forlovede as Emmy Tørning, writer
 1916	Det levende lig as Anna Dmitrijenva Karenin
 1916	Taarnet as Gertrud Funke
 1921	Den kære familie as Ida, Friis' daughter
 1923	Aprilsnarrene as Trine, Madam Rar's daughter
 1923	Forældre, in various roles

Dagmar Theatre
 1936	Dronningens mand as Dronning Martha (Queen Martha)

Hotelteatret
 1914	Kærlighed og lykketræf as Silvia, Orgon's daughter

Odense Theatre
 1918	Den vægelsindede as Lucretia

Aarhus Theatre
 1906	Stor i skrøbelighed as Emma Jansen
 1906	Aprilsnarrene as Trine
 1918	Den kære familie as Emily
 1918	Den vægelsindede as Lucretia

Publications

References

Citations

 
 
 

1868 births
1953 deaths
Burials at Vestre Cemetery, Copenhagen
Danish stage actresses
19th-century Danish actresses
20th-century Danish actresses
Danish women memoirists
19th-century Danish memoirists
20th-century Danish memoirists
People from Horsens
Recipients of Ingenio et Arti